Fábio dos Santos Barbosa (born 9 October 1980 in Campina Grande, Paraíba) is a former Brazilian footballer.

Career 
Fábio Santos started his career at Sao Paulo state.

Fábio Santos was signed by Lyon in January 2007 from Cruzeiro.

He was loaned to São Paulo FC in January 2008 until July 2008. After being released by Lyon, he signed a -year contract with Fluminense in May 2009, rejoining Fred. On 26 April 2010 Cruzeiro signed the midfielder, the player coming from Fluminense and signed until 31 December 2010.

After the match against São Paulo on 13 May 2010, Fábio Santos told the press that the match was his last as a player due to successive pains to his knee, which suffered four surgeries during his career, and he claimed he wasn't fully recovered from his last injury.

Career statistics

Achievements
 Campeonato Paulista: 2004
 Campeonato Mineiro: 2006
 Ligue 1: 2007, 2008
 Trophée des Champions: 2007

References

External links
 

Brazilian footballers
Brazilian expatriate footballers
Associação Desportiva São Caetano players
C.D. Nacional players
Cruzeiro Esporte Clube players
Olympique Lyonnais players
São Paulo FC players
Clube Náutico Capibaribe players
Campeonato Brasileiro Série A players
Primeira Liga players
Ligue 1 players
Expatriate footballers in Portugal
Expatriate footballers in France
Association football midfielders
Brazilian expatriate sportspeople in Portugal
Brazilian expatriate sportspeople in France
People from Campina Grande
1980 births
Living people
Sportspeople from Paraíba